Paulina Peak is a summit in Deschutes County, Oregon, United States. Formed by the Newberry Volcano, it is part of Newberry National Volcanic Monument. The Cascade Range can be seen extending into California (Mount Shasta) and Washington (Mount Adams) from the peak on a clear sunny day.

References

External links

Mountains of Oregon
Newberry National Volcanic Monument